Rotation, sometimes called rotation pool, 15-ball rotation, or 61, is a pool game, played with a  billiards table, and triangular rack of fifteen billiard balls, in which the lowest-numbered  on the table must be always struck by the cue ball first, to attempt to  numbered balls for .

Each players points are increased by the corresponding number of the ball pocketed. So, if a player pockets balls numbered one through eleven their score will be sixty one. These in addition to the fortitude to mentally, with knowledge, act out each planned play; complex problem solving displayed when physically performing each cue ball play are the players main attractions.

Rules

Object
The object of the game is to score the most points, by pocketing higher-scoring balls than the opponent(s).  A  (individual game) is won when a player or team reaches a number of points (usually 61) that makes it impossible for the opponent(s) to win.  A  may consist of multiple frames (e.g. a ), or in multiple  of multiple frames (e.g. three rounds of best 2-out-of-three), as in other types of pool.

Scoring
Points are scored by pocketing the object balls on the table; the number of points awarded is equal to the number printed on the ball pocketed; for example, pocketing the 4 ball scores the player 4 points. In a two-player (or two-team) game, the frame is over when a player or team has at least 61 points, one more than half the number of available points. Games tied at 60 points can occur, in which case the player who last legally pocketed a ball is credited with a bonus point and declared the winner. More than two players or teams can play, with the winning score being whatever number will mathematically eliminate other players from outscoring the leader.

Set up
In informal British play, it is common to push the rack forward farther so that the 15 ball, still in the center of the rack, is resting on the foot spot. (See illustration at top of article.)

Game play
The primary rule of the game is that the lowest numbered object ball on the table at any time is the "" and must be struck first (including on the break shot – a side break is a foul), regardless of the player's intentions of which ball to actually pocket. Players may use the lowest numbered ball to pocket other (e.g. higher value) balls. Consequently, this not being a  game, points are also counted if a ball is unintentionally but legally pocketed (a "" or ""). A player's turn at the table continues until a shot fails to legally pocket a ball, a foul is committed, or the frame concludes. Illegally pocketed balls are spotted.

Safeties
 play is rather strictly limited in rotation. If a player legally pockets a ball, that player must shoot again; unlike in many games, there is no provision for a called, intentional safety play that pockets a ball.  Safeties that consist of simply using the cue ball to drive the ball-on to the closest , without contacting another object ball in the course of the shot, are limited to only two such shots per player per frame.  Other safeties are unlimited, provided that the lowest numbered ball is struck first and either at least two object balls move in the course of the shot, or the ball-on is driven to a cushion that is not the closest to it.

Fouls
Shots taken from behind the head string must cause the cue ball to cross the head string; however, if the ball-on is behind the head string, the player with ball in hand (including a fouling player who has been forced to take the shot by the opponent) may optionally have that ball spotted on the foot spot before shooting. There is no point penalty for fouls. Three consecutive fouls (i.e. on three consecutive turns at the table) by the same player is a loss of frame.

Fouls include:
Failure to hit the lowest-numbered object ball first (or at all)
Scratching the cue ball into a pocket or off the table (incoming player has ball-in-hand behind the headstring, though may force the fouling opponent to shoot)
Failure to either legally pocket an object ball, or drive any ball to a 
Knocking an object ball off the table (it is spotted; balls legally pocketed on the shot are not)
A third or subsequent one ball safety to the closest cushion (see above)

Team play
Two-player  (or larger) teams compete by alternating teams and alternating players within each team. For example, if teams consist of players 1 and 2 versus players 3 and 4, and player 1 breaks, turns alternate in the pattern 1 (breaking), 3, 2, 4, 1, 3, 2, 4, etc.  I.e., the ending of a player's turn at the table ends that team's turn at the table. As in individual competition, a player's turn at the table does not end until a foul is committed or the player fails to legally pocket an object ball (or the frame ends).

Three consecutive fouls by a team player disqualifies that player for the remainder of the frame (i.e., if player 3 were disqualified in the above example, then subsequent play order would be 4, 1, 2, 4, 1, 2, etc.)  Balls that were legally pocketed by the disqualified player are not spotted.

Informally, team play can also be conducted in  format. However, the disqualification rule does not apply, and three consecutive fouls by the team are a loss of frame (otherwise, the team with the hypothetically disqualified player would have an advantage, in no longer having to coordinate two players).

Variations

Short Rack Rotation
Simple rotation is the most basic rotation game, being directly derived from basic pyramid pool. The object of simple rotation is to pocket the most balls while still shooting at the balls in order. Simple rotation being a shorter version of 15 ball rotation.  Short rotation games such as 6,7,9 and 10 ball; these games are meant to be run out with out missing.  Advanced short rack rotation games usually consistent of one inning.  The players inning starts with a break shot and continues until the lowest numeric ball was not played into a pocket.

Nine-ball
The major competitive game nine-ball and its variants (six-ball, seven-ball, and ten-ball) are rotation games but with a smaller ball set and without the point-based scoring. In these games only the namesake number of balls are used the lowest numbered ball must be contacted with the cue ball prior to contacting and other ball on the table. Once all the object balls have been played into a pocket, another game may start.  Other times victory can happen when the player pockets the highest numbered ball in the rack, as in 9 ball rotation.  Even if it is pocketed before all other balls and when the winner pockets no other balls but the highest numbered ball.

Rotation Games
In all rotation games, the balls must be pocketed sequentially, not the first contact on the table. In 15 ball rotation, if the lowest ball on the table is struck but a higher ball ends up being pocketed then that higher ball must be  back on the table after the shot; this is not a foul, but merely ends the shooter's turn as if it were a miss. If the lowest-numbered ball is hit first and is pocketed, but another ball also is pocketed, that other ball is spotted immediately, and the shooter's turn continues.

In the Philippines 
In the Philippines, rotation pool is  popular, especially among advanced players, although eight-ball, nine-ball and, increasingly, ten-ball, are widely played.

References 

Pool (cue sports)